The Foreign Emergency Support Team (FEST) is an interagency task force of the United States government, tasked with on-call short-notice responses to terrorist incidents across the world. It consists of personnel from military, intelligence, and diplomatic agencies, as well as other departments when required.

History 
The FEST was created in 1986, and has long since largely remained shrouded in mystery. Since then has deployed over thirty times to critical situations around the world. The team deploys on four hours notice to assist and advise the U.S. Chief of Mission in assessing crises and coordinating U.S. government crisis response activities.

The Diplomatic Security Service leads the FEST, and it includes representatives from the U.S. Department of State, Department of Defense, the Intelligence Community, and the Federal Bureau of Investigation, and other appropriate agencies, such as the Department of Energy, as circumstances warrant. FEST composition is flexible and tailored to the specific incident and U.S. Embassy needs. The FEST provides specialized crisis response expertise to augment existing U.S. Mission and host government capabilities. In addition to terrorism, the unit specializes in responding to Weapons of Mass Destruction and CBRNE events.

FEST is the counterpart of the Domestic Emergency Support Team (DEST) which serves a similar role for crises within the United States.

Activity

U.S. Embassy Bombings 

The FEST was particularly active when operatives of Osama bin Laden's al-Qaeda network bombed U.S. embassies in Kenya and Tanzania.

USS Cole bombing

A FEST was deployed to Aden, Yemen following a terrorist attack against the USS Cole, which killed 17 American sailors in October 2000. The FEST advised the US ambassador and helped her direct America's response to the attack. The team relied heavily on FEST's secure mobile communications capability, since the Port of Aden is more than 200 miles from the American Embassy in Sanaa.

Beirut Port Explosion 

On August 7, 2020, the FEST deployed from Andrews Air Force Base to Beirut, Lebanon, to lend support to the U.S. Embassy in Beirut as part of the U.S. government’s response following what was later discovered to be an ammonium nitrate fire which caused one of the largest artificial non-nuclear explosions in human history in the city's port. The blast on August 4 had ripped through the port of Beirut, causing extensive injuries and damage throughout the surrounding area. Shortly after the blast, the U.S. Embassy in Beirut requested support from the DSS-led FEST to help coordinate interagency support for emergency response, restoration of essential services, and public health and safety protection.

Training

Invincible Sentry 21 
In March 2021, members of the FEST participated in a five-day military crisis response exercise between Qatari and U.S. military forces in Doha, Qatar. Exercise Invincible Sentry 2021 (IS 21) is an annual U.S. Central Command training event, hosted this year by the government of Qatar. IS 21 included close coordination and training with the Qatar’s Ministry of Defense, the U.S. Embassy Doha, and other U.S. government entities.

Contingency teams 
"Contingency" FESTs were deployed to ensure safety at the Olympic Games in Athens, Greece (Summer 2004) and Turin, Italy (Winter 2006), and in Lagos, Nigeria during a hostage-taking crisis.

Smaller deployments 
The team has been spotted flying into Iraq, throughout central Europe, and several times in Amman, Jordan. Team constituent agencies organize a FEST to conduct training with partner nations often.

Smaller, "tailored" FESTs have responded to abductions of Americans in Ecuador and the Philippines.

Composition 
Organizations and units which commonly comprise the FEST:

 Department of State
 Diplomatic Security (lead bureau)
 Bureau of Public Affairs
 Bureau of Consular Affairs
 Bureau of International Security and Non-Proliferation
 Bureau of Operational Medicine
 Bureau of Counterterrorism and Countering Violent Extremism

 Department of Defense
 Army Reserve Counter Terrorism Unit
 Other military units as appropriate
 Federal Bureau of Investigation
 Department of Health and Human Services
 Department of Energy
 United States Agency for International Development
 Bureau of Humanitarian Affairs
 U.S. Intelligence Community
 Other federal agencies as appropriate

Equipment

Boeing C-32B 

 The FEST is a primary user of the specialized Boeing C-32B transport aircraft, shared with the CIA, and operated by the New Jersey Air National Guard's 150th Special Operations Squadron and Air Force Special Operations Command's 486th Flight Test Squadron.

See also 

 Domestic Emergency Support Team
 Nuclear Emergency Support Team
Diplomatic Security Service

References 

Incident management
Foreign relations of the United States
United States Department of State
Counterterrorism in the United States